The 1992–93 Austrian Hockey League season was the 63rd season of the Austrian Hockey League, the top level of ice hockey in Austria. Six teams participated in the league, and EC VSV won the championship.

Regular season

Playoffs

Semifinals

Final

External links
Austrian Ice Hockey Association

Austrian Hockey League seasons
Aus
1992–93 in Austrian ice hockey leagues